Mokhratagh or Kichik Garabey is a village that is, de facto, in the Martakert Province of the breakaway Republic of Artsakh; de jure it is in the Tartar District of Azerbaijan, in the disputed region of Nagorno-Karabakh. The village has an ethnic Armenian-majority population, and also had an Armenian majority in 1989.

History 
During the Soviet period, the village was part of the Mardakert District of the Nagorno-Karabakh Autonomous Oblast.

Historical heritage sites 
Historical heritage sites in and around the village include the 12th-century church of Iny Masants, rebuilt in 1881, a medieval cemetery, and the church of Surb Astvatsatsin built in 1883.

Economy and culture 
The population is mainly engaged in agriculture and animal husbandry. As of 2015, the village has a municipal building, a house of culture, a secondary school, three shops, and a medical centre.

Demographics 
The village had 345 inhabitants in 2005, and 341 inhabitants in 2015.

References

External links 
 

Populated places in Martakert Province
Populated places in Tartar District